Hadhramout University was established in Hadhramaut as an official university in 1993. It includes a college of medicine.

References

Universities in Yemen
Educational institutions established in 1996
1996 establishments in Yemen